Saqra Mach'ay (Quechua saqra malignant, pernicious, bad, bad tempered, wicked; restless; devil, synonym of supay, mach'ay cave, Hispanicized spelling Sagramachay) is a mountain in the Andes of Peru, about  high, in the Pasco Region, Pasco Province, Ticlacayan District. It lies northwest of the Waqurunchu mountain range, southeast of Wamanripayuq.

References

Mountains of Peru
Mountains of Huánuco Region
Mountains of Pasco Region